Franklin's Forest lies near the centre of the East End distinct of Grand Cayman, one of the Cayman Islands, a British Overseas Territory in the Caribbean Sea. It is one of the territory's Important Bird Areas (IBAs).

Description
Franklin's Forest is a 111 ha tract of native tropical dry forest bordered by Conocarpus wetlands and farmland. It lies south of the Salina Reserve and east of Queen Elizabeth II Botanic Park. It is unprotected and partly privately owned.

Birds
The IBA was identified as such by BirdLife International because it supports populations of white-crowned pigeons, Cuban amazons, Caribbean elaenias, thick-billed vireos, Yucatan vireos and vitelline warblers.

References

Important Bird Areas of the Cayman Islands
Tropical and subtropical dry broadleaf forests
Grand Cayman